The 2014 McDonald's All-American Girls Game is an All-Star basketball game that was played on April 2, 2014, at the United Center in Chicago, Illinois, home of the Chicago Bulls. The game's rosters featured the best and most highly recruited high school girls graduating in 2014.  The game is the 13th annual version of the McDonald's All-American Game first played in 2002.

2014 Game
The game was roughly even from the tipoff until halftime, as the East only led by 1 point. The second half was much of the same - a close, back and forth game. The East took its first lead of the second half with 8:30 remaining on 2 free throws by Myisha Hines-Allen and then both teams seesawed back and forth until the finish. The East tied up the game again on 2 free throws of their own by A'ja Wilson. The West came back and Jordin Canada found Brianna Turner open right inside the free throw line for the game winning basket to give the West a 2-point win.

Rosters

2014 East Roster

2014 West Roster

Coaches
The East team was coached by:
 Head Coach — Angie Hembree of Norcross High School (Norcross, Georgia)
 Assistant coach — Jay Nebel of Norcross High School (Buford, Georgia)
 Assistant coach — Tamara Brooks of Norcross High School (Norcross, Georgia)

The West team was coached by:
 Head Coach - Randy Napier of Perry County Central High School (Bonnyman, Kentucky)
 Assistant coach - Kevin Whitman of Perry County Central High School (Hazard, Kentucky)
 Assistant coach - Jeff Campbell of Perry County Central High School (Hazard, Kentucky)

Game

See also
2014 McDonald's All-American Boys Game

References

External links
McDonald's All-American on the web

2014 in American women's basketball
2014